The Miller cylindrical projection is a modified Mercator projection, proposed by Osborn Maitland Miller in 1942. Hence:

or inversely,

where λ is the longitude from the central meridian of the projection, and φ is the latitude. Meridians are thus about 0.733 the length of the equator.

In GIS applications, this projection is known as: "ESRI:54003 – World Miller Cylindrical".

Compact Miller projection is similar to Miller but spacing between parallels stops growing after 55 degrees.

See also

 List of map projections

References

External links

 Math formulae information
 Historical information
 Miller projection in proj4

Map projections
Cylindrical projections